Michael Penn (born 1958) is an American singer, songwriter, and composer.

Michael Penn may also refer to:
Michael Penn (author), professor of religious studies 
Mike Penn (born 1989), rugby union player